A shoe tree is a tree (or occasionally, a powerline pole or other wooden object) that has been festooned with old shoes, generally through the act of shoe tossing. Shoe trees are generally located alongside a major local thoroughfare, and may have a theme (such as high-heeled shoes). In 2017 there were at least forty-five such shoe trees in the United States.

List of shoe trees

Shoe Tree: Cherokee, Alabama
Sardis Shoe Tree: Sardis, Arkansas
Bra Tree: Flagstaff, Arizona
Shoe Tree: Tonto Basin, Arizona
Shoe Tree Unloved by the Elderly: Big Bear Lake, California
Shoe Tree: Hallelujah Junction, California
Shoe Tree: Long Barn, California
Ono Shoe Tree: Ono, California
Shoe Tree: Ravendale, California
Shoe Tree: Rice, California
Shoe Tree: Blairsville, Georgia
Shoe Tree: St. Simons Island, Georgia
Shoe Tree - Only 3 pairs: Kuna, Idaho
Shoe Tree: Highland Park, Illinois
Shoe Tree: Ottawa, Illinois
Shoe Tree: Woodstock, Illinois
Shoe Tree: Albany, Indiana
Shoe Tree: Milltown, Indiana
Shoe Tree: Troy, Indiana
Shoe Tree: Mount Vernon, Iowa
Shoe Tree: Murray, Kentucky
Shoe Tree: Atlanta, Michigan
Shoe Tree - Cursed!: Belding, Michigan
Shoe Tree: Comins, Michigan
Shoe Tree: Kalkaska, Michigan
Shoe Tree: Salem, Michigan
Shoe Tree: Strongs, Michigan
Urban Shoe Tree: Minneapolis, Minnesota
Shoe Tree, High Heel Variant: Albuquerque, New Mexico
Shoe Tree: Beatty, Nevada
Shoe Tree: Virginia City, Nevada
Sneaker Tree - Shoe Trees: Lyndonville, New York
Shoe Tree: Bainbridge, Ohio
Shoe Tree: Cleveland, Ohio
Shoe Tree: Worthington, Ohio
Route 66 Shoe Tree: Stroud, Oklahoma
Shoe Tree: Alfalfa, Oregon
Shoe Tree in a Lovely Park: Beaverton, Oregon
Shoe Tree: Bend, Oregon
Shoe Tree Formerly in Redmond: Bend, Oregon
Shoe Tree: Mitchell, Oregon
Shoe Tree: Tumalo, Oregon
Dot's Mini Museum - Cowboy Boot Tree: Vega, Texas
Shoe Tree: Emery County, Utah
Shoe Tree: Hinckley, Utah
Shoe Trees: Park City, Utah
Shoe Tree: Green Bay, Wisconsin
Shoe Tree Junior: Sundance, Wyoming
Skater's Tree: Olympia, Washington Skaters take non-skaters shoes down
Shoe Tree: Studley Green, Buckinghamshire, United Kingdom

See also
 Panty tree

Notes

References

Roadside attractions in the United States
Uses of shoes
Trees in culture